The St. Dumitru Church is a church  in Orhei, Moldova.

References

Orhei
Religious buildings and structures completed in 1636
Cathedrals in Moldova
1636 establishments in Europe